Pagans in Vegas is the sixth studio album by Canadian indie rock band Metric, which was released on 18 September 2015. The first single, "The Shade", was released on 11 May 2015. "Cascades" was released as the second of the album on 2 June 2015. On 7 July 2015, the band released "Too Bad, So Sad" as the third single via a new iOS and Android app it created called "Pagan Portal", which allows fans to listen to tracks off the album as they're released and read newsletters from the band.

Critical response

Pagans in Vegas received generally positive reviews from music critics. At Metacritic, which assigns a normalized rating out of 100 to reviews from mainstream critics, the album received an average score of 65, based on 15 reviews, which indicates "generally favorable reviews".

Track listing

Charts

References

 "Metric premieres “The Shade”, first new song in nearly three years — listen" Retrieved June 5, 2015.
 "Metric Tease New Album ‘Pagans in Vegas’ With Slickly Synthesized ‘Cascades’" Retrieved June 5, 2015.
 "Metric Debut “Too Bad, So Sad” Via The Pagan Portal App" Retrieved July 7, 2015.

2015 albums
Metric (band) albums
Mom + Pop Music albums